Jim Brandenburg (born November 23, 1945) is an environmentalist and nature photographer and filmmaker based near Ely, Minnesota. His career includes over 10 years as a newspaper photojournalist, over 30 years as a contract photographer for the National Geographic Society, and commissions from such groups as the United States Postal Service, NHK and the BBC.

Jim Brandenburg is a Fellow of the International League of Conservation Photographers

Recognition

In 1991, for his work with the Wolf Ridge Environmental Learning Center, his creation of the Concerts for the Environment non-profit organization, his work with the Nature Conservancy, and other numerous achievements, Jim Brandenburg was awarded the Global 500 Environmental World Achievement Award. This United Nations sponsored recognition was presented to him by the King of Sweden Carl XVI Gustaf.

In 2006, Jim Brandenburg was awarded with an honorary degree, Doctor of Humane Letters, by the University of Minnesota.

Jim Brandenburg was a Hasselblad Master in 2002, a Nikon Legend Behind the Lens in 2001 and a Canon Explorer of Light photographer 2005 - 2008.

Jim Brandenburg's images were chosen for inclusion in a collection that represents the 40 most important nature photographs of all time. The Top Forty nominations include the work of 25 photographers including Ansel Adams, Edward Weston, and Eliot Porter.  Four of Brandenburg¹s images were included in the final selection, more than any other photographer. The four Brandenburg images selected were: Oryx on Namib Desert, Namibia, southwest Africa; Gray Wolf near BWCAW, Ely, Minnesota; Leaping Arctic wolf, Ellesmere Island, Canada; and Bison on Frozen Landscape, Blue Mounds State Park, Luverne, Minnesota.  They were chosen by members of the International League of Conservation Photographers (iLCP) a fellowship of the world's top professional conservation photographers.

Outdoor Photography Magazine included Brandenburg in "40 Most Influential Nature Photographers."

Jim Brandenburg's well-known image of the leaping Arctic wolf was named one of 100 most important photos in Canadian history and was included in the book "100 Photos that Changed Canada".

Photographic books

Brandenburg's National Geographic work

External links
 Jim Brandenburg's site
 Brandenburg Prairie Foundation
 National Public Radio Interview: Jim Brandenburg on "Chased By the Light"
 Minnesota Public Radio Discussion: Jim Brandenburg on Wilderness Preservation
 International League of Conservation Photographers
Jim Brandenburg is interviewed by Richard “Fred” Arey about his latest book, Chased By the Light (Northword Press), an impressive series of pictures taken once each day over a three month period, along with earlier works, White Wolf, Minnesota: Images of Home, and some of his many photo essays for National Geographic magazine, recorded at his Ravenwood studio near Ely, Minnesota, Northern Lights TV Series #436  (1999):  [https://reflections.mndigital.org/catalog/p16022coll38:114#/kaltura_video] or on YouTube:  [https://www.youtube.com/watch?v=AXpumpgUmeo]

References

American photojournalists
Nature photographers
Artists from Minnesota
Living people
1945 births
People from Luverne, Minnesota
University of Minnesota Duluth alumni
People from Worthington, Minnesota
People from Ely, Minnesota